Euarestoides dreisbachi is a species of fruit fly in the family Tephritidae.

Distribution
Guatemala, Mexico, Peru.

References

Tephritinae
Insects described in 1958
Diptera of South America